The Basic Treaty is the shorthand name for the Treaty concerning the basis of relations between the Federal Republic of Germany and the German Democratic Republic. The Federal Republic of Germany and German Democratic Republic (GDR) recognized each other as sovereign states for the first time, an abandonment of West Germany's Hallstein Doctrine in favor of Ostpolitik.

After the entry into force of the Four-Power Agreement from 1971, the two German states began negotiations over a Basic Treaty. As for the Transit Agreement of 1972, the discussions were led by the Under-Secretaries of State Egon Bahr (for the Federal Republic of Germany) and Michael Kohl (for the German Democratic Republic). As part of the Ostpolitik of Chancellor Willy Brandt, the treaty was signed on 21 December 1972 in East Berlin. The treaty was ratified the following year by West Germany and came into effect in June 1973.

The signing of the treaty in December 1972 paved the way for both German states to be recognised by the international community. Diplomatic relations were opened between the German Democratic Republic and:
 Australia (December 1972),
 the United Kingdom, France and the Netherlands (February 1973),
 the United States (December 1974).
Both German nations were also admitted to the United Nations on 18 September 1973.

Under the terms of the 1973 treaty, the two states established de facto embassies known as "permanent missions", headed by "permanent representatives", who served as de facto ambassadors. West Germany sent its first permanent representative in February 1974, but formal diplomatic relations were never established until German reunification (in October 1990).

See also
Treaty of Moscow, 1970
Transit Agreement (1972)
Four Power Agreement on Berlin

References
Basic Treaty between the Federal Republic of Germany and the GDR (December 21, 1972) on the German Historical Institute Website

Notes

Further reading
Address by the Chancellor of the FRG, Helmut Schmidt, to the third stage of the Conference on Security and Co-operation in Europe, Helsinki, 20 July to 1 August 1975 (PDF)

1972 in Germany
Cold War treaties
History of East Germany
Treaties of East Germany
Treaties concluded in 1972
Treaties entered into force in 1973
Treaties of West Germany
1972 in East Germany
East Germany–West Germany relations
Willy Brandt